New Zealand–Thailand relations refers to bilateral relations between New Zealand and Thailand. New Zealand has an embassy in Bangkok whilst Thailand has an embassy in Wellington. Both countries are members of the Asia-Pacific Economic Cooperation.

History
The two countries established diplomatic ties  in 1956.

The two countries celebrated their 60 years of diplomatic relations in 2016. There are some 10,000 Thais living in New Zealand. The Royal Thai Police has worked closely with the New Zealand Police for more than 30 years.

New Zealand upgraded relations with the Thai military government in 2016.

References 

 
Thailand
Bilateral relations of Thailand